Laram Q'awa (Aymara larama blue, q'awa little river, ditch, crevice, fissure, gap in the earth, "blue brook" or "blue ravine", also spelled Laramkhaua) is a  mountain in the Andes of Bolivia. It is situated in the La Paz Department, Pacajes Province, Charaña Municipality, north-west of Río Blanco. An intermittent stream which downstream is named Jach'a Uma ("big water", Jacha Uma) originates near the mountain. It flows to Achuta River in the south-east.

References 

Mountains of La Paz Department (Bolivia)